Marilopteryx lutina is a species of cutworm or dart moth in the family Noctuidae. It is found in North America.

The MONA or Hodges number for Marilopteryx lutina is 10633.

References

Further reading

 
 
 

Eriopygini
Articles created by Qbugbot
Moths described in 1902